Všeruby is a town in Plzeň-North District in the Plzeň Region of the Czech Republic. It has about 1,600 inhabitants.

Administrative parts
Villages of Chrančovice, Chrástov, Klenovice, Kokořov, Popovice and Radimovice are administrative parts of Všeruby.

Geography
It lies in the Plasy Uplands. The Třemošná Stream flows through the town.

Notable people
Carola Braunbock (1924–1978), German actress
Franz Metzner (1870–1919), German sculptor

References

External links

Cities and towns in the Czech Republic
Populated places in Plzeň-North District